Raymond Ablack (born November 15, 1989) is a Canadian actor and comedian. He began his career in the early 2000s as a child actor on stage, performing as Young Simba in The Lion King at the Princess of Wales Theatre. He later gained recognition for playing Sav Bhandari in the teen drama television series Degrassi: The Next Generation (2007–2011).

From 2014 to 2017, Ablack starred in the web series Teenagers; he was nominated for an International Academy of Web Television Award and won an Indie Series Award for his performance in 2016. He is also known for his supporting roles in the television series Orphan Black (2013–2016), Narcos (2017), Shadowhunters (2016–2018), Burden of Truth (2019), Maid (2021), and Ginny & Georgia (2021–present).

Early life 
Ablack was born and raised by Indo-Guyanese parents in Toronto, Ontario. Growing up, he played in a competitive hockey league. Ablack has three siblings: two younger sisters, Cassandra and Rebecca (who is also an actress and she was featured alongside him in Ginny & Georgia), and a younger brother, Jared.

Career 
As a child actor, Ablack appeared in television commercials and advertisements. In 2001, he won the role of Young Simba in the theatre production of The Lion King at the Princess of Wales Theatre in Toronto. He performed the role for one year.

Years later, in 2007, Ablack achieved international exposure when he was cast in the recurring role of Sav Bhandari on the long-running Canadian television series Degrassi: The Next Generation. He starred on the show for five years and appeared in more than 100 episodes. During this time, Ablack also had a guest spot on the television series Life With Derek.

Since his time on Degrassi, Ablack has worked on several productions, including recurring roles in the BBC/Space television series Orphan Black, the Syfy series Defiance, and the Freeform series Shadowhunters. In addition to working as an actor, Ablack sometimes writes and performs stand-up comedy in Toronto.

Ablack's first role in a feature-length film came in 2013 with the release of the independent feature film Fondi '91 (2013), which received mixed reviews from critics upon release.

From 2014 to 2017, Ablack portrayed Gabriel in the web series Teenagers. In 2016, for his performance in the second season of Teenagers, Ablack won an Indie Series Award for Best Supporting Actor – Drama. For his performance in the third and final season, Ablack was nominated for an International Academy of Web Television Award, in 2017, and a second Indie Series Award, in 2018.

Ablack played the recurring role of DEA Agent Stoddard in the third season of the critically acclaimed Netflix series Narcos, which premiered on the streaming platform in 2017.

In 2019, he played the recurring role of Sunil Doshi in Burden of Truth. That year, he also appeared alongside Zoey Deutch, Judy Greer, Jermaine Fowler, Noah Reid, and Jai Courtney in the American comedy drama film Buffaloed. The film had its world premiere at the Tribeca Film Festival on April 27, 2019.

In August 2019, Deadline announced that Ablack would be featured in the forthcoming Netflix series Ginny & Georgia. Ginny & Georgia premiered on February 24, 2021. Ablack starred as Joe, a restaurant owner and one of Georgia's love interests; he appeared in all 10 episodes of the series.

That year, Ablack also played a supporting role in the Netflix miniseries Maid, which was released on October 1, 2021. His performance and physique in the series, specifically a scene in which he appears topless while wearing a cowboy hat, attracted considerable attention on social media, with Marie Claire writing that "the Canadian actor has become our favorite Netflix heartthrob." In November 2021, he was cast in a romantic comedy feature film called Love in the Villa, also produced by Netflix.

Charity work 
Ablack has done extensive charity work throughout his career, mostly through Degrassi, including school-building missions with Me to We and Free the Children. 

In 2007, Ablack traveled to Africa with five other Degrassi cast members to build a school in Kenya and, in 2008, he travelled again with his cast members to do charity work in Ecuador. A documentary of Ablack and his cast mates' trip aired on MTV in Canada. In 2010, he travelled with his fellow Degrassi cast mates to India to help build schools.

Filmography

Film

Television

Awards and nominations

References

External links 

 

1989 births
Living people
21st-century Canadian comedians
21st-century Canadian male actors
Canadian male actors of Indian descent
Canadian male comedians
Canadian male television actors
Canadian people of Guyanese descent
Canadian people of Indian descent
Canadian stand-up comedians
Cardinal Carter Academy for the Arts alumni
Comedians from Toronto
Male actors from Toronto